Franklin & Marshall is an Italian clothing manufacturer and retailer, founded and headquartered in Montorio Veronese, a town in the province of Verona in 1999.

The company was founded in 1999 by two entrepreneurs in Montorio Veronese, a town in the province of Verona. The founders, Giuseppe Albarelli and Andrea Pensiero, discovered an old Franklin & Marshall College (based in Lancaster, Pennsylvania) jumper in a London charity shop, and started a fashion label because they liked the name.

90% of their clothing is made in Italy.

References

External links

Clothing companies established in 1999
Retail companies established in 1999
Italian brands
Clothing companies of Italy
Companies based in Verona
Italian companies established in 1999